Synaptic vesicle membrane protein VAT-1 homolog is a protein that in humans is encoded by the VAT1 gene.

Synaptic vesicles are responsible for regulating the storage and release of neurotransmitters in the nerve terminal. The protein encoded by this gene is an abundant integral membrane protein of cholinergic synaptic vesicles and is thought to be involved in vesicular transport. It belongs to the quinone oxidoreductase subfamily of zinc-containing alcohol dehydrogenase proteins.

In melanocytic cells VAT1 gene expression may be regulated by MITF.

References

Further reading